Air Armenia CJSC was a passenger and cargo airline with its head office in Yerevan, Armenia, and base at Zvartnots International Airport.

History
The airline was established in 2003 and started operations on 18 March 2003. Since all passenger rights were granted on an exclusive basis to Armavia in 2003, Air Armenia could only operate cargo aircraft. The owners of Air Armenia were Versand Hakobyan and Gagik Tsarukyan.

After the liquidation of Armavia in 2013, Air Armenia announced its plans to launch passenger services as well, and became the largest air carrier of Armenia. In July 2013, General Department of Civil Aviation of Armenia granted Air Armenia designations to operate passenger flights.

On 29 October 2014, the airline suspended all operations until at least 20 December due to financial problems.

A Ukrainian investment fund announced the purchase of a 49 percent stake in Armenia's leading airline on Friday, pledging to help restart soon its commercial flights. Vladimir Bobylev, the chief executive of the East Prospect Fund, pledged to invest at least $30 million in the troubled Air Armenia carrier. Armenian news agencies quoted him as saying that it plans to replace and expand the company's small fleet of aircraft in the coming months.

Destinations
Air Armenia served the following destinations : (all flights suspended)

References

External links
Air Armenia official website
Air Armenia official Facebook page
Air Armenia official VK page

Defunct airlines of Armenia
Airlines established in 2003
Armenian companies established in 2003
Defunct charter airlines